Julien Ariel De Sart (born 23 December 1994) is a Belgian professional footballer who plays as a defensive midfielder for Gent.

He began his career in the youth academy of Standard Liège. De Sart went on to sign his first professional contract with the club's senior team in 2013, making his debut in that same year. In 2016, he signed for Middlesbrough, who would go on to achieve promotion to the Premier League that same season. He rarely played at the club, and went on loan to Derby County for more first-team experience. Following his parent club's relegation, he was sent on loan to Zulte Waregem.

De Sart represented his national country at under-16, under-17, under-18, under-19 and under-21 level.

Club career

Standard Liège
On 22 August 2013, De Sart made his debut in the UEFA Europa League against Belarusian FC Minsk in a 2–0 away win. He played the full game. He's a youth exponent from the club. He is the son of Jean-François De Sart who has been a board member of Standard Liège, and the elder brother of Alexis De Sart who previously played for Standard Liège.

He made his league debut at 25 August 2013 against R.A.E.C. Mons in a 2–0 away win, coming off the bench in the first half for an injured Yoni Buyens. After 83 minutes he was sent off with a second yellow card. At 24 November 2013, he scored the only goal against R.A.E.C. Mons.

Middlesbrough
On 1 February 2016, it was confirmed that De Sart had joined English club Middlesbrough of the Championship side on a three-and-a-half year contract for an undisclosed fee.

On 5 January 2017, it was confirmed that De Sart would be moving to Derby County on loan for the remainder of the season. He scored his first goal for Derby in a 4–3 loss to Cardiff City on 14 February 2017.

On 27 June 2017, De Sart was sent on loan to Belgian Pro League team Zulte Waregem for the 2017–18 season, thus making a return to Belgium after leaving Standard Liège in January 2016.

Kortrijk
In August 2018, De Sart left Middlesbrough and joined Kortrijk.

Gent
On 15 June 2021, he moved to Gent on a three-year contract.

Career statistics

References

External links
 

1994 births
People from Waremme
Living people
Belgian footballers
Association football midfielders
Belgium youth international footballers
Belgium under-21 international footballers
Standard Liège players
Middlesbrough F.C. players
Derby County F.C. players
S.V. Zulte Waregem players
K.V. Kortrijk players
K.A.A. Gent players
Belgian Pro League players
English Football League players
Belgian expatriate footballers
Expatriate footballers in England
Belgian expatriate sportspeople in England
Footballers from Liège Province